Khadeeja (1939/40 - 26 July 2017) was an Indian actress in Malayalam movies. She was one of the prominent lead actress during the late 1960s and 1970s in Malayalam. In 1968, she acted in Viruthan Shanku, the first full-length comedy in Malayalam cinema directed by P. Venu. She was born in Odakaali in Perumbavoor, Kerala, a Muslim girl who had suffered a lot for learning dance in Kalamandalam. She acted in more than 50 movies.

Personal life
She was born as the second among six children to Moideen and Pathayi at Chittethupadi, Perumbavoor. Her siblings were Sainaba, Nabeesa, Khasim, Ibrahim and Salimraj. She had her primary education from Vaduthala Government high school, Ernakulam.
She was married to K.V. Mathew. They had six children, Vinni, Leena, Sony, Teddy, Stency and Sophie. Khadeeja died on 26 July 2017 due to lung cancer at her residence Vaduthala, Ernakulam.

Filmography

Saat Rang Ke Sapne (1998) as Tribal lady - hindi movie
Shibiram (1997) as Hostel warden
 Sathyabhaamaykkoru Pranayalekhanam (1996) as Kunjimaalu
 Thenmavin Kombath (1994) as Aadivasi
 Bhaarya (1994)
 Kudumbavishesham (1993)
  Shankaran Kuttikku Pennu Venam (1990)
  Aalasyam (1990)
 Kiratham (1985) as Mariyamma
 Nishedi (1984) as Mariyamma
 Vilkkanundu Swapnangal (1980)
 Lovely (1979)
 Pancharatnam (1979)
 Kaithappoo (1978)
 Puthariyankam (1978)
 Kudumbam Namukku Sreekovil (1978) as Puli Narayani 
 Beena (1978) as Betty's Mother
 Pocketadikkari (1978)
 Prarthana (1978)
 Varadakshina (1977)
 Yatheem (1977)
 Amma (1976)
 Prasadam (1976) as Sankari
 Chirikkudukka (1976)
 Udyaanalakshmi (1976)
 Sexilla Stundilla (1976)
 Swarnna Malsyam (1975)
 Chandanachoa (1975)
Chattambikkalyaani (1975) as Paaru
 Kalyaanappanthal (1975)
 Love Letter (1975)
Hello Darling (1975) as Kamalabhai
 Pattaabhishekam (1974)
 Swarnnavigraham (1974)
 Ayalathe Sundari (1974) as Pushkosa
 College Girl (1974)
 Nathoon (1974)
 Poonthenaruvi (1974) as Anna
 Maasappadi Maathupilla (1973)
 Bhadradeepam (1973)
 Manassu (1973)
 Enipadikal (1973)
 Thiruvabharanam (1973)
 Manushyaputhran (1973) as Kaalikutty
 Pacha Nottukal (1973) as Mariamma
 Kapalika (1973)
 Jesus (1973)
 Periyar (1973)
 Padmavyooham (1973) as Ealiyamma
 Ladies Hostel (1973) as Karthyayani
 Ajnaathavasam (1973) as Rajeswari Simon
 Driksaakshi (1973) as Janakikutty
 Punarjanmam(1972)
 Baalya Prathijna (1972)
 Aadyathe Kadha (1972) as Kunjalakshmi
 Kandavarundo (1972) as Ambujam
 Sambhavami Yuge Yuge (1972) as Radhamma
 Myladum Kunnu (1972)
 Lakshyam (1972)
 Omana (1972) as Rajamma 
 Devi (1972)
 Aaromalunni (1972)
 Lanka Dahanam (1971)
 Sumangali (1971) as Rathnamma
 Ernakulam Junction (1971) as Vilasini
 Yogamullaval (1971)
 Makane Ninakku Vendi (1971) as Kalyani
 Line Bus (1971) as Kathreena
 Moonnu Pookkal (1971) 
 Jalakanyaka (1971) 
 Kaakkathampuraatti (1970)
 Ambalapraavu (1970)
 Nishaagandhi (1970)
 Priya (1970)
 Bheekara Nimishangal (1970) as Janaki
 Vazhve Mayam (1970) as Kamalkshi
 Thurakkaatha Vaathil (1970) as Janakiyamma
 Aa Chithrashalabam Paranaotte (1970) 
 Sthree (1970) 
 Sarasathy (1970) 
 Vila Kuranja Manushyan(1969)
 Kallichellamma (1969)
 Sandhya (1969)
 Aryankavu Kollasangham (1969)
 Velliyazhcha (1969)
 Kattu Kurangu (1969)
 Kannoor Deluxe (1969)
 Vilakkappetta Bandhangal (1969)
 Pooja Pushpam (1969)
 Manaswini (1968)
 Punnapra Vayalar (1968) as Mariya
 Lakshaprabhu (1968)
 Velutha Kathreena (1968)
 Laskhaprabu (1968)
 Thulabharam (1968) as Karthyayani
 Asuravithu (1968)
 Viruthan Shanku (1968) as Ichikkavu
 Madatharuvi (1967)
 Pareeksha(1967) as Pankajam
 Chithramela (1967)
 Cochin Express (1967)
 Kaavalam Chundan (1967)
 Pavappettaval (1967)

Dramas
 Inqulabinte Makkal
 Vishakkunna Karinkali

References

External links

 Khadeeja at MSI
 YouTube 
 UMMA 1960
 Kerala Letter
 CINIDIARY - A Complete Online Malayalam Cinema News Portal

Actresses in Malayalam cinema
Indian film actresses
Actresses from Kerala
Year of birth missing
2017 deaths
People from Ernakulam district
20th-century Indian actresses
1930s births